Atiqul Haque Chowdhury (15 December 1930 – 17 June 2013) was a prominent media personality in Bangladesh. He had significantly contributed to the development of Bangladesh Television and Bangladesh Radio.

Biography
Chowdhury began his career as a producer and programme organiser at Radio Pakistan Dhaka in 1960, later joining PTV Dhaka in 1965. Atiqul Haque Chowdhury has been one of the leading personalities actively involved in the BTV in its golden era (from late 1970s to late '80s). He started as a producer and retired as the deputy director general of the state-run TV station in 1991. During his tenure, he made over 450 TV plays. A number of quality radio plays were also written and directed by him.

Atiqul Haque Chowdhury has been entertaining the audience of radio and television by producing many good dramas in the last 50 years. Apart from producing his own radio and TV plays, he has projected many good pieces of literature of the greatest Bengali writers through both the media, and has earned a name and fame by his analytical and insightful creativity. With his spellbinding dramatic skill, he could make the listeners and viewers sob or burst into laughter, and he raised watchers' emotions to the fullest. He has skilfully manifested his own literary taste, social consciousness and creative outlooks not only through his writing but also through the plays written by others. He was committed to experimenting with plays and avoiding the usual way of producing plays. He has also manipulated symbols and allegory. His treatment of symbols and allegory was entertaining as well as thought-provoking. Imbibed with true patriotism he is still on the drama horizon of Bangladesh as a beacon light to inspire his listeners and viewers irrespective of caste, creed and birth.

He was also a guest teacher at the Department of Drama and Dramatics at Jahangirnagar University for 11 years. He later jointed Ekushey Television as an Advisor.

List of works

Notable radio productions
Tagore’s Nosto Nirr and Shesher Kobita
Sharat Chandra’s Pother Dabi, Srikanto and Debdash
Abu Ishaque’s Surjo Dighol Bari

Notable TV productions
Tagore’s Shesher Kobita, Maloncha, Chokher Bali, Drishtidan, Khoka Babur Prottabortan and Guptadhan
Shawkat Osman’s Kritodasher Hashi
Nazmul Alam's Koch O Athocho Pabitra
Humayun Ahmed’s Kushum
Enamul Haque’s Ghriho Bashi

Radio and TV plays written by him, produced by him
Durbin Diya Dekhun
Nil Nokshar Shondhaney
Shukher Upoma
Babar Kolom Kothai?

Awards
Bangla Academy honorary Fellowship (2010) for writing and directing TV plays,  
Sequence of Merit Award from Bangladesh Shilpakala Academy (twice),
Honorary Doctorate Degree from World Development Council (New Delhi, 1990) for his contribution to TV plays,
Best TV Producer Award (1976)

References 

1930 births
2013 deaths
Bangladeshi dramatists and playwrights
Academic staff of Jahangirnagar University
Bangladeshi television personalities
Bangladeshi radio personalities
20th-century dramatists and playwrights
People from Barisal District